is a Japanese footballer who plays as an midfielder for  club Hokkaido Consadole Sapporo.

Club career

In August 2016 Kobayashi joined Eredivisie side SC Heerenveen from Júbilo Iwata in the J1 League. After his contract was not renewed at SC Heerenveen, he moved on a free transfer to Waasland-Beveren in September 2019.

In September 2020, Waaslan-Beveren announced that he would transfer to Qatari club Al-Khor.

In July 2021, Kobayashi joined Seoul E-Land FC of K League 2. He left the club at the end of the season through a mutual consent.

In February 2022, he joined Gangwon FC of K League 1.

International career
Kobayashi made his first appearance for the Japan national football team in a friendly 1–2 loss to Bosnia and Herzegovina.

Career statistics

Club

International

International goals
Scores and results list Japan's goal tally first.

References

External links
 
 
 
 
 

1992 births
Living people
Association football people from Tokyo
Association football midfielders
Japanese footballers
Japanese expatriate footballers
Japan international footballers
Expatriate footballers in the Netherlands
Japanese expatriate sportspeople in the Netherlands
Expatriate footballers in Qatar
Expatriate footballers in South Korea
Japanese expatriate sportspeople in South Korea
J1 League players
J2 League players
Eredivisie players
Belgian Pro League players
Qatar Stars League players
K League 2 players
K League 1 players
Tokyo Verdy players
Júbilo Iwata players
SC Heerenveen players
S.K. Beveren players
Al-Khor SC players
Seoul E-Land FC players
Gangwon FC players
Vissel Kobe players
Hokkaido Consadole Sapporo players